The 2019–20 international cricket season was from September 2019 to April 2020. 29 Test matches, 78 One Day Internationals (ODIs) and 145 Twenty20 Internationals (T20Is), as well as 23 Women's One Day Internationals (WODIs) and 61 Women's Twenty20 Internationals (WT20Is), were scheduled to be played during this period. Additionally, a number of other T20I/WT20I matches were also scheduled to be played in minor series involving associate nations. The season started with India leading the Test cricket rankings, England leading the ODI rankings and Pakistan leading the Twenty20 rankings. In the women's rankings, Australia women lead both the WODI and WT20I tables. The 2020 ICC Women's T20 World Cup in Australia took place during this time, starting on 21 February 2020, with hosts Australia winning the tournament for the fifth time.

In July 2019, the International Cricket Council (ICC) suspended Zimbabwe Cricket, with the team barred from taking part in ICC events. It was the first time that a Full Member of the ICC had been suspended. As a result of Zimbabwe's suspension, they were replaced in the 2019 ICC Men's T20 World Cup Qualifier tournament with Nigeria. In October 2019, the ICC lifted its suspension on Zimbabwe Cricket, allowing them to take part in future ICC events. The Cricket Association of Nepal, which was suspended in 2016, was also readmitted as an ICC member.

International men's cricket started with a one-off Test between Bangladesh and Afghanistan, which Afghanistan won. During the 2019 United States Tri-Nation Series, the United States recorded their first win in ODIs. During the 2020 Nepal Tri-Nation Series, the United States were bowled out for 35 in their final match against Nepal, which was the joint-lowest innings total in an ODI match. Leagues A and B of the World Cup Challenge League started in this season, with Canada winning the inaugural edition of the League A tournament.

In September 2019, Australia Women won the WODI series against the West Indies Women 3–0, becoming the first team to qualify for the 2021 Women's Cricket World Cup. In October 2019, Australia Women were confirmed as the champions of the 2017–20 ICC Women's Championship, following their win in the second WODI against Sri Lanka Women. Australia went on to win the third WODI by nine wickets, winning the series 3–0, and setting a new record for the most consecutive wins in WODIs, with 18.

In October and November 2019, the 2019 ICC Men's T20 World Cup Qualifier tournament was held in the UAE. Papua New Guinea and Ireland became the first two teams to qualify directly to the 2020 ICC Men's T20 World Cup in Australia, when they won their respective groups. Namibia, the Netherlands, Oman and Scotland also qualified for the 2020 ICC T20 World Cup, with the Netherlands winning the Qualifier tournament. The day after the final of the T20 World Cup Qualifier tournament, the 1,000th men's T20I match was played, between India and Bangladesh, in Delhi.

In December 2019, the Sri Lankan cricket team toured Pakistan playing two Test matches, marking the return of Test cricket in Pakistan after ten years. In February 2020, Bangladesh won the 2020 Under-19 Cricket World Cup, their first win in an ICC event at any level.

The COVID-19 pandemic impacted on several international cricket fixtures and tournaments. A women's quadrangular series was scheduled to take place in Thailand in April 2020, but was cancelled a month before it was due to start. The 2020 Malaysia Cricket World Cup Challenge League A, scheduled to take place in March 2020, was postponed, along with two T20I matches between a World XI and Asia XI side. Australia Women's tour to South Africa in March 2020 became the first major international series not to go ahead as planned due to coronavirus. On 13 March 2020, the ICC confirmed that the 2020 United States Tri-Nation Series had been postponed due to the outbreak and travel restrictions to the United States. On the same day, the two-match Test series between Sri Lanka and England, scheduled to be played in March 2020, was also postponed. The last two ODIs between India and South Africa were cancelled, along with the Netherlands' tour to Namibia. On 14 March 2020, Australia cancelled the final two ODIs and their T20I series against New Zealand. On 16 March 2020, the Pakistan Cricket Board cancelled the third leg of the series against Bangladesh, which was scheduled to have a one-off ODI and a Test match. Later the same day, Ireland's tour to Zimbabwe was also cancelled. On 24 March 2020, the ICC confirmed that all ICC qualifying events scheduled to take place before 30 June 2020 had been postponed.

Season overview

Rankings

The following were the rankings at the beginning of the season.

On-going tournaments
The following were the rankings at the beginning of the season.

September

Afghanistan in Bangladesh

Australia women in West Indies

2019–20 Bangladesh Tri-Nation Series

2019 United States Tri-Nation Series

2019–20 Ireland Tri-Nation Series

South Africa in India

The last two ODI matches were cancelled in March 2020 due to the COVID-19 pandemic.

2019 Malaysia Cricket World Cup Challenge League A

South Africa women in India

2019–20 Singapore Tri-Nation Series

Sri Lanka in Pakistan

Sri Lanka women in Australia

October

2019–20 Oman Pentangular Series

2019 ICC Men's T20 World Cup Qualifier

Final standings

 Qualified for the 2020 ICC Men's T20 World Cup and 2021 ICC Men's T20 World Cup Qualifier.

Bangladesh women in Pakistan

Sri Lanka in Australia

November

England in New Zealand

India women in West Indies

Pakistan in Australia

Bangladesh in India

West Indies vs Afghanistan in India

December

2019 Oman Cricket World Cup Challenge League B

West Indies in India

2019 United Arab Emirates Tri-Nation Series

England women against Pakistan women in Malaysia

New Zealand in Australia

The last two ODI matches were cancelled in March 2020 due to the COVID-19 pandemic.

England in South Africa

January

2020 Oman Tri-Nation Series

Sri Lanka in India

Ireland in West Indies

Australia in India

2020 Under-19 Cricket World Cup

Sri Lanka in Zimbabwe

India in New Zealand

Bangladesh in Pakistan

The one-off ODI and the second Test were cancelled in March 2020 due to the COVID-19 pandemic.

South Africa women in New Zealand

2020 Australia women's Tri-Nation Series

February

2020 Nepal Tri-Nation Series

2020 ICC Women's T20 World Cup

Australia in South Africa

Zimbabwe in Bangladesh

West Indies in Sri Lanka

March

Ireland vs Afghanistan in India

England in Sri Lanka
The two Test matches were postponed in March 2020 due to the COVID-19 pandemic, with the series rescheduled for January 2021.

Mujib 100 T20 Cup Bangladesh 2020

The two T20I matches were postponed in March 2020 due to the COVID-19 pandemic.

Australia women in South Africa

In early March 2020, the tour was postponed due to the COVID-19 pandemic.

Australia in New Zealand

The series was cancelled in March 2020 due to the COVID-19 pandemic.

Netherlands in Namibia

The tour was cancelled in March 2020 due to the COVID-19 pandemic.

April

2020 United States Tri-Nation Series

The ODI series was postponed in March 2020 due to the COVID-19 pandemic.

Ireland in Zimbabwe

The tour was cancelled in March 2020 due to the COVID-19 pandemic.

2020 Thailand Women's Quadrangular Series
A women's quadrangular series between Ireland, the Netherlands, Zimbabwe and the hosts Thailand was cancelled in early March 2020 due to the COVID-19 pandemic.

2020 Namibia Tri-Nation Series

The ODI series was postponed in March 2020 due to the COVID-19 pandemic.

See also
 Associate international cricket in 2019–20
 Impact of the COVID-19 pandemic on cricket

Notes

References

2019 in cricket
2020 in cricket